Geoff Cottrill (born July 4, 1963) is an American marketer who currently serves as Chief Marketing Officer at Top Golf. He formerly held top positions at Procter & Gamble, Coca-Cola, Starbucks, and Converse. He is the father of the musical artist Clairo.

Career
Cottrill is currently serving as CMO at Top Golf. He is also the co-founder of MARVIN. Cottrill has also held the position of Vice President at Starbucks Entertainment Hear Music in Seattle, Washington. Between 2007 and 2016, he was Chief Marketing Officer of Converse, a subsidiary of Nike, Inc. In 2014, he was appointed vice-chair of Grammy Foundation, a non-voting philanthropic organization dedicated to raising money for music preservation and music education. The organization created the Music Educator of the Year Award.  Between 2015 and 2017, he was president of American operations at MullenLowe Group.

In 2010, he was named one of Brandweek's "Marketers of the Year".

Personal life
Cottrill resides in Atlanta, Georgia and on Cape Cod with his wife, professional children's fashion photographer, Allie Cottrill. Cottrill is the father of the musical artist Clairo. According to The New York Times, her record label signing was made possible by her father's connection to Jon Cohen, co-founder of The Fader and an executive at the publication's marketing agency, Cornerstone. His role in the launching of his daughter's professional career attracted scrutiny from some online communities with regard to the singer's authenticity.

References

External links
 
 
 

American marketing people
Starbucks people
Nike, Inc. people
1963 births
Living people
Coca-Cola people
Florida State University alumni